Lake Ry de Rome is an artificial lake near the city of Couvin, Wallonia, in Belgium near the border of France. The lake is located in the Ardennes. The water volume is 2,200,000 m³ and the area is 0.25 km2.

Artificial lakes
Lakes of the Ardennes (Belgium)
Lakes of Namur (province)